Heaven Fitch (born March 1, 2003) is an American wrestler who wrestles in 106-pound weight class.

As a high school student wrestler at Uwharrie Charter in Randolph County, North Carolina, Fitch became the first female wrestler to place in the North Carolina High School Athletic Association's (NCHSAA) individual wrestling state championships in 2019, when she placed fourth. In 2020, she won the 1A 106 pound state championship, making her the first female wrestler in North Carolina history to win an individual wrestling state championship. That same year, she was also named Most Outstanding Wrestler in the 1A class. Her senior year in 2021, she lost in the semi-finals of the NCHSAA 1A state tournament to eventual state champion and former opponent Luke Wilson of Robbinsville, and finished third in the 106 pound class.

Fitch was inspired to start wrestling after watching her older brothers participate in the sport. At six years old, Fitch told her parents she wanted to wrestle. They told her no at first. Eventually, she started wrestling.

"HEAVEN", a documentary of Fitch's career, was released on the WWE Network on March 7, 2021, narrated by WWE Hall of Famer, Beth Phoenix.

References

American female sport wrestlers
Wrestling in North Carolina
Female wrestlers
People from Randolph County, North Carolina
2003 births
Living people
21st-century American women